Marbury High School in Autauga County, Alabama serves grades 9-12 and is part of the Autauga County School System. As of the 2017–2018 school year, the schools student body consisted of 590 high school students.

Notable alumni
 Brandon Dickson, Current MLB player (St. Louis Cardinals)
 Pierre Warren, NFL player
 Dewayne White, NFL Football player

References

External links
 Official Website of Marbury School
 Old Website of Marbury High School

Public high schools in Alabama
Educational institutions established in 1910
Schools in Autauga County, Alabama
1910 establishments in Alabama